Edgar Rumney (15 September 1936 – 18 August 2015) was an English professional footballer who played for Colchester United.

Biography
Born in Abberton in Essex, Rumney signed for Colchester in 1957, having been an apprentice at the club. A full back, he made his debut against QPR on 2 September 1957, and went on to make 49 appearances for the club, before leaving to join Sudbury Town as player-coach in 1964. After retiring from playing football he became involved with Abberton & District Cricket Club, going on to become the club's record holder for number of appearances (1,627) and wickets taken (1,831), as well as serving as club captain and president.

References

1936 births
2015 deaths
People from the Borough of Colchester
English footballers
Colchester United F.C. players
Sudbury Town F.C. players
English Football League players
Association football defenders